Maulana Mohammad Merajuddin Mehsud was a Pakistani politician and Islamic scholar who served as members of the 12th National Assembly of Pakistan from 16 November 2002 -02-10-2007.

Death 
He was assassinated on 20 May 2010 in Tank.

References

2010 deaths
Pakistani Islamic religious leaders
Pakistani Sunni Muslims
Pakistani MNAs 2002–2007
Jamiat Ulema-e-Islam (F) politicians
People from South Waziristan